Fenella Justine Therese Woolgar (born 4 August 1969) is an English film, theatre, television and radio actress. She is known for her roles in the films Bright Young Things (2003) and Judy (2019). She is also well known for appearing in TV shows Doctor Who as crime novelist Agatha Christie, Inside Number 9, and Call the Midwife as Sister Hilda.

Early life 
Woolgar was born in the West London Borough of Hillingdon to parents Michael and Maureen ( McCann)  Woolgar. Her mother is of Irish descent. Woolgar's early years were spent in New Canaan, Connecticut, USA. She was educated at Mayfield School, Durham University, and then Royal Academy of Dramatic Art (RADA). 

At university, along with acting she directed Murder in the Cathedral in Durham Cathedral and wrote and performed comedy in The Durham Revue.

Career 
Following Woolgar's graduation from RADA in 1999 she worked in rep at The Royal Exchange, Manchester, York Theatre Royal, Sheffield Crucible and for the BBC in both television and radio. In 2002 she was cast as Agatha in Stephen Fry's film Bright Young Things for which she was nominated for several awards. She subsequently went on to work with Mike Leigh in Vera Drake and Mr. Turner, Conor McPherson in The Veil at the National Theatre and Woody Allen in Scoop and You Will Meet a Tall Dark Stranger.  She played Agatha Christie in Doctor Who in 2008. In 2010 she voiced the character of Dr. Sofia Lamb, the main antagonist in the video game BioShock 2. 

Woolgar has most recently worked in theatre at the Donmar, Royal Court, National Theatre; the Old Vic and in the West End. She won the Clarence Derwent Award for Best Supporting Actress in the West End in 2013 and the Sunday Times Culture Award for Stage Performance of the Year 2014 for playing Margaret Thatcher in Handbagged. She is regularly heard on the radio and was nominated for Best Actress on the radio in 2013 for An American Rose in which she played Rosemary Kennedy. She played the title role in Mrs Dalloway for BBC Radio 4 and Edith Wharton in both The Jinx Element and Ethan Frome. She stars in the BBC Radio 4 comedy Dot. She has narrated several audiobooks and was nominated for Audio Book of the Year 2013. 

Woolgar's recent work includes two television roles. She appeared in 2014 and 2015 as Alison Scotlock in Home Fires. She joined the cast of Call the Midwife in series 8 as Sister Hilda.

Awards and award nominations 
Celebrity Portrait Artist of the Year - Sky Arts 2019
 Stage Performance of the Year – The Sunday Times Culture Awards 2014
 Clarence Derwent Award for Best Supporting Actress in the West End 2013.'Woolgar has been nominated for several awards, including:
 Best Supporting Actress – What's On Stage Awards 2013
 Best Actress –  BBC Radio Drama Awards 2013
 Best Audio Book of the Year (for Life After Life) 2013
 Best Supporting Actress – British Independent Film Awards 2003
 Best Supporting Actress – Empire Film Awards 2003
 Best Supporting Actress – London Critics Circle 2003
 Best Newcomer – Evening Standard Theatre Awards 2003
 Best Supporting Actress – Manchester Evening News Awards 2000 and 2001

Filmography
Film

Television

Theatre
 1994: Nelly, Playboy of the Western World, Bristol Old Vic
 1999: Varya, The Cherry Orchard, York Theatre Royal
 2000: Lucy, Bring Me Sunshine, Royal Exchange, Manchester
 2000: Kitty Verdun, Charley's Aunt, Sheffield Crucible
 2000: Celia, As You Like It, Royal Exchange, Manchester
 2001: Eleanor, The Miser, Salisbury Playhouse
 2001: Teresa, How the Other Half Loves, Watford Palace Theatre
 2002: Emma, Way Upstream, Derby Playhouse
 2002: Helena, A Midsummer Night's Dream, Royal Exchange Theatre, Manchester
 2004: Adela, Passage to India, Shared Experience Theatre Company
 2005: Charlotte Brontë, Brontë, Shared Experience Theatre Company
 2006: Helen, Motortown, Royal Court, London
 2009: Madge, Time and the Conways, National Theatre, London directed by Rupert Goold
 2010: Charlotte, The Real Thing at the Old Vic, London
 2011: Madeleine, The Veil by Conor McPherson, National Theatre, London, directed by Conor McPherson
 2012: Thea Elvsted in Brian Friel's adaptation of Hedda Gabler, Old Vic, London
 2013: Theresa in Circle Mirror Transformation, Royal Court Local Theatre, Rose Lipman Building, Haggerston, London
 2013: Margaret Thatcher (Mags) in Handbagged by Moira Buffini, Tricycle Theatre, London
2014: Margaret Thatcher (Mags) in Handbagged, Vaudeville Theatre, London
2016: Valerie, Welcome Home Captain Fox, Donmar Warehouse, London
2017: Miss Roach, The Slaves of Solitude, Hampstead Theatre, London

Radio
Includes:
 Virginia Woolf in The Hours for BBC Radio 4, Polly Thomas and Judith Kampfner
 Poetry Please with Roger McGough for BBC Radio 4
 Book of the Week for Radio 4 including Only In Naples by Katherine Wilson and Millions Like Us by Virginia Nicholson
 Dot in Dot by Ed Harris, series 1 and 2
 Blood Sex and Money – Zola, BBC Radio 4 Polly Thomas written by Dan Rebellato
 Mrs Dalloway in Mrs Dalloway, BBC Radio 4 Marc Beeby
 Rosemary Kennedy in An American Rose, BBC Radio 4 Sally Avens
 Edith Wharton in Ethan Frome and in The Jinx Element, BBC Radio 4 Sally Avens
 Before They Were Famous, Hat Trick
 Flaw in the Motor, Dust in the Blood, BBC Radio 4, Toby Swift written by Trevor Preston
Miss Bingley in Pride and Prejudice, as part of the Jane Austen BBC Radio Drama Collection

Audio
Includes:
 Life After Life and Transcription by Kate Atkinson
 The Other Family and Daughters in Law by Joanna Trollope
 Midwinter Murder: Fireside Tales from the Queen of Mystery, a collection of winter-themed short stories by Agatha Christie
 Dr. Sofia Lamb – BioShock 2''

See also
List of RADA alumni

References

External links

Living people
1969 births
20th-century English actresses
21st-century English actresses
Actresses from London
Alumni of St Mary's College, Durham
Alumni of RADA
Audiobook narrators
English film actresses
English television actresses
English people of Irish descent
English radio actresses
English stage actresses
People from the London Borough of Hillingdon
People from New Canaan, Connecticut